Lan Shaomin (born January 1964) is a Chinese politician, currently serving as the Communist Party Secretary of Suzhou and Vice-Governor of Jiangsu province.

He joined the CPC in 1984, and began his career in 1985. From 2003 to 2006, he served as Vice-Mayor of Nantong City, and as Executive Vice-Mayor from 2006 to 2011. From 2011 to 2012, he  served as acting Mayor of Suqian City. From 2012 to 2014, he served as Secretary of the Suqian City Committee. He would also serve concurrently from 2012 to 2013 as Mayor of Suqian. From 2014 to 2017, he served as Secretary of the Taizhou City CPC Committee. In 2018, he started to serve as the Mayor of Nanjing, following Miao Ruilin’s resignation. He served as Communist Party Secretary of Suzhou since September 2019 for a year before appointed deputy party secretary of Guizhou in 2020. 

He is selected as the Chairman of the Heilongjiang Provincial Committee of the Chinese People's Political Consultative Conference in January 2023.

References

1964 births
Living people
Mayors of Nanjing
People's Republic of China politicians from Guangdong
Chinese Communist Party politicians from Guangdong
Nanjing University of Aeronautics and Astronautics alumni
People from Dabu
Politicians from Meizhou